Nebula is an American rock band formed by guitarist Eddie Glass and drummer Ruben Romano upon departing Fu Manchu in 1997. Mark Abshire soon joined as the band's original bassist.

Abshire remained with the band until the recording of Atomic Ritual, which was produced by Chris Goss of Kyuss fame. Dennis Wilson and Simon Moon (Eddie Glass) stepped in as bassists until a more permanent replacement was found in Tom Davies. Rob Oswald replaced founding member Ruben Romano on drums in 2007.

In August 2009, Adam Kriney, formerly of La Otracina, was recruited to replace departing drummer Oswald, though he too announced his departure in January 2010 and was replaced by Jimmy Sweet. In early 2010, Nebula announced that it was going on an indefinite hiatus. Glass later explained that "things started getting a bit rough with the touring and I got sick of it", though Nebula were merely "taking a break for a while" and not breaking up.

Nebula reunited in 2017 and now features drummer Michael Amster of Mondo Generator. The band released their sixth studio album, Holy Shit, on June 7, 2019, on the Heavy Psych Sounds Records label. Their seventh studio album, Transmission From Mothership Earth, was released on July 22, 2022.

Personnel 
Current members
 Eddie Glass – guitar, vocals (1997–present)
 Tom Davies – bass (2003–present)
Michael Amster – drums (2017–present)

Former members
 Ruben Romano – drums (1997–2007)
 Mark Abshire – bass (1997–2003)
 Isaiah Mitchell – bass  (2003)
 Dennis Wilson – bass (2003)
 Rob Oswald – drums (2007–2009)
 Adam Kriney – drums (2009–2010)
 Jimmy Sweet – drums (2010–2017)

Discography

Studio albums 
 To the Center – 1999 – Sub Pop
 Charged – 2001 – Sub Pop
 Atomic Ritual – 2003 – Liquor & Poker
 Apollo – 2006 – Liquor & Poker
 Heavy Psych – 2009 – Tee Pee
 Holy Shit – 2019 – Heavy Psych Sounds
 Transmission From Mothership Earth – 2022 – Heavy Psych Sounds

Singles & EPs 
  Nebula / That's All Folks! - Vulcan Bomber / Aquasphere – 1997 – Last Scream Records (Split 7")
 Let It Burn – 1998 – Tee Pee Records
 Sun Creature – 1999 – Man's Ruin (EP)
 Nebula/Lowrider – 1999 – Meteor City (Split EP)
 Clear Light – 2000 – Sweet Nothing Records
 Do It Now – 2000 – Sweet Nothing Records
 Nebula – 2003 – Liquor and Poker Music
  Nebula / Winnebago Deal - Strange Human / Taking Care of Business – 2003 – Sweet Nothing Records (Split 7")
 Peel Sessions – 2008 – Sweet Nothing Records
  Nebula / Quest For Fire - The Perfect Rapture / In the Place of a Storm – 2010 – Tee Pee Records (Split 7")

Live albums 
 BBC Peel Sessions – 2008 – Sweet Nothing
 Live in the Mojave Desert: Volume 2 – 2021 – Giant Rock, Heavy Psych Sounds

Compilation albums 
 Dos EPs – 2002 – Meteor City
Demos & Outtakes 98–02 – 2019 – Heavy Psych Sounds

Featured compilations 
 In the Groove ("Full Throttle") – 1999 – The Music Cartel
"High Times" High Volume: The Stoner Rock Collection ("The Void") – 2004 – High Times Records

References

External links 

Musical groups from Los Angeles
Musical groups established in 1997
Musical groups disestablished in 2010
Psychedelic rock music groups from California
Relapse Records artists
American stoner rock musical groups
Sub Pop artists
Man's Ruin Records artists
Liquor and Poker Music artists
American musical trios
1997 establishments in California